Spanish mantle may refer to:

Mantilla, a traditional Spanish shawl worn over the head and shoulders, often over a high comb
Drunkard's cloak, a type of pillory